Grant Connell and Patrick Galbraith were the defending champions but did not compete that year.

Rick Leach and Scott Melville won in the final 7–6, 6–4 against Leander Paes and Nicolás Pereira.

Seeds
Champion seeds are indicated in bold text while text in italics indicates the round in which those seeds were eliminated. The top four seeded teams received byes into the second round.

Draw

Final

Top half

Bottom half

External links
 1995 Volvo International Doubles draw

Doubles